Donald Adrian Woolnough  (1920–2003) was an Australian international lawn bowler.

Bowls career

World Championships
Woolnough won a silver medal in the fours with Leigh Bishop, Barry Salter and Keith Poole, a bronze medal in the pairs with Bob Middleton and a bronze medal in the team event (Leonard Cup) at the 1976 World Outdoor Bowls Championship in Johannesburg.

Coaching
He coached the 1990 Commonwealth Games Australian bowls team.

Awards
Woolnough was awarded the Medal of the Order of Australia in the 1995 Australia Day Honours for "service to lawn bowls" and the Australian Sports Medal in 2000. He died in 2003 and was posthumously inducted into the Australian Hall of Fame in 2015.

References

1920 births
2003 deaths
Australian male bowls players
Recipients of the Medal of the Order of Australia